Martin Heinisch (born April 6, 1985) is a Czech professional ice hockey forward for 1. EV Weiden of the Oberliga.

He played 113 games with HC Litvínov in the Czech Extraliga.

Heinisch played previously also for KLH Chomutov and BK Mladá Boleslav.

References

External links

1985 births
Living people
Czech ice hockey forwards
ETC Crimmitschau players
HC Litvínov players
BK Mladá Boleslav players
HC Most players
Sportspeople from Most (city)
Piráti Chomutov players
HC Slovan Ústečtí Lvi players
HC Stadion Litoměřice players
1. EV Weiden players
Naturalized citizens of Germany
Czech expatriate ice hockey players in Germany
Czech people of German descent